Okukenu Sagbua (fl. 1845-1862) was a Yoruba Egba chief. He was a founding member of the Ogboni of Egbaland, and also served as the first Alake of Egbaland.

Life
Upon the exodus of the Egba refugees to the comparative safety of Olumo Rock in the aftermath of their homeland's destruction during the Yoruba Civil Wars, the traditional councils of chiefs - otherwise known as the Ogboni - that had formerly governed them were reconstituted. An Eso Ikoyi warlord known as Okukenu was co-opted into the civil council during this exercise, and so his erstwhile title - Sagbua - was recognized as a civil one thereafter, even though it had originally been a military rank.

Following the death of the Egba paramount chief Shodeke in 1845, Okukenu and a brace of other powerful chiefs ruled Abeokuta jointly for a time. The rivalry that existed between them led to an anarchy that was only exacerbated by the slave trade, which was then at its peak.

After the death of the Losi of Ake (hitherto a favourite to succeed Shodeke), Okukenu was chosen and crowned on the 8th of August, 1854. He thus became the first Alake to reign in the fortified city of Abeokuta. As an ex-civil chief, he had the support of the civil chiefs during his reign, but was opposed by both the war chiefs and the trade chiefs, who had both profited from the state of anarchy.

Okukenu managed to maintain order in his kingdom despite their efforts, though his authority wasn't great. He was supported in this by Bashorun Apati, a former rival, who held office during his reign as the prime minister of Egbaland.

Okukenu died in 1862. During the subsequent interregnum, the Bashorun administered the kingdom.

Descendants
One of Okukenu's descendants, Adedotun Aremu Gbadebo III, is the current Alake of Egbaland.

References

Nigerian traditional rulers
Abeokuta
19th-century Nigerian people